Ulf Lindholm (born 1963) is a Swedish politician. He was elected as Member of the Riksdag in September 2022. He represents the constituency of Västernorrland County. He is affiliated with the Sweden Democrats.

References 

Living people
1963 births
Place of birth missing (living people)
21st-century Swedish politicians
Members of the Riksdag 2022–2026
Members of the Riksdag from the Sweden Democrats